Tokyo is the most populated of Japan's 47 prefectures. The tallest structure in the prefecture is Tokyo Skytree, a lattice tower that rises , which was completed in 2012. It also stands as the tallest structure in Japan, the tallest tower in the world and the third-tallest freestanding structure in the world. The tallest building and third-tallest overall structure in Tokyo is the 256-metre-tall (838 ft) Toranomon Hills, which was completed in 2014. Overall, of the 25 tallest buildings and structures in Japan, 17 are in Tokyo.

Skyscrapers are a relatively recent phenomenon in Japan. Due to aesthetic and engineering concerns, Japan's Building Standard Law set an absolute height limit of 31 metres until 1963, when the limit was abolished in favor of a Floor Area Ratio limit. Following these changes in building regulations, the Kasumigaseki Building was constructed and completed in 1968. A booming post-war Japanese economy and the hosting of the 1964 Summer Olympics helped lead to a building boom in Tokyo during the 1960s and 1970s. Construction continued through the 1980s and 1990s as the Japanese asset price bubble rose and fell. Mainland Tokyo is divided into two sections: Western Tokyo and the special wards of Tokyo. All of the prefecture's tallest buildings are within the 23 special wards, which comprise the area formerly incorporated as Tokyo City. Nishi-Shinjuku, a district within Shinjuku, was the prefecture's first major skyscraper development area. Starting with the construction of the Keio Plaza Hotel in the 1971, the district is now home to 13 of Tokyo's 46 tallest skyscrapers.

Tokyo has been the site of many skyscraper construction projects in recent years. Since 2015, ten buildings rising higher than  have been completed. As of May 2020, eleven such buildings are under construction in the prefecture. Several other construction projects planned to exceed the height of 187 metres are proposed for the near future.

Tallest buildings
This list ranks the tallest 50 skyscrapers in Tokyo, based on standard height measurement. This height includes spires and architectural details but does not include antenna masts. An equal sign (=) following a rank indicates the same height between two or more buildings. The "Year" column indicates the year in which a building was completed. Freestanding towers, guyed masts and other not habitable structures are included for comparison purposes; however, they are not ranked.

Demolished buildings

Under construction
This lists buildings that are under construction in Tokyo and are planned to rise at least . Any buildings that have been topped out but are not completed are also included.

* Indicates buildings that are still under construction but have been topped out.

Timeline of tallest buildings

This is a list of buildings that once held the title of tallest building in Tokyo. Since its completion in 2012, Tokyo Skytree has been the tallest structure in Tokyo as well as in Japan, overtaking Tokyo Tower.

Tallest structures
This height includes spires, architectural details and antenna masts.

Demolished or destroyed structures

See also
List of tallest structures in Japan

Notes
A. This structure is not a habitable building but is included in this list for comparative purposes. Per a ruling by the Council on Tall Buildings and Urban Habitat, freestanding observation towers, chimneys or masts are not considered to be buildings, as they are not fully habitable structures.
B. Marcus Island is not within the special wards of Tokyo. Administratively, the island is part of Ogasawara, Tokyo.
C. Nishitōkyō is not within the special wards of Tokyo. It is one of the 30 cities, towns and villages included in Western Tokyo.
D. Iwo Jima is not within the special wards of Tokyo. Administratively, the island is part of Ogasawara, Tokyo.

References

General
 Tokyo, Emporis.com
 Diagram of Tokyo skyscrapers, SkyscraperPage.com
 Tokyo, The Skyscraper Center

Specific

Tokyo
Tallest